The Melbourne Renegades is an Australian cricket club who play in the Big Bash League, the national domestic Twenty20 competition. Along with cross-town rivals, Melbourne Stars, the club was established in 2011 as an inaugural member of the eight-club league. The Big Bash League consists of a regular season and a finals series of the top four teams.

Records

List of players

 

Source: ESPN.cricinfo Renegades Batting records and ESPN.cricinfo Renegades Bowling & Fielding records

See also
 Melbourne Renegades
 Big Bash League

References 

Lists of Australian cricketers

Big Bash League lists
Melbourne sport-related lists